Ivan Mykolayovych Holovkin (born 24 May 2000) is a Ukrainian professional footballer who plays as a midfielder for Inhulets Petrove.

Career
Holovkin is a product of the Shakhtar Donetsk youth sportive school in his native city and from August 2017 he spent his early career in the Ukrainian amateur levels, in the Ukrainian Premier League Reserves and Under 19 Championship and in the Ukrainian Second League.

In June 2021 he signed a contract with the Ukrainian Premier League team Inhulets Petrove.

References

External links
 
 

2000 births
Living people
Footballers from Donetsk
Ukrainian footballers
FC Krystal Kherson players
FC Mariupol players
FC Volyn Lutsk players
FC Inhulets Petrove players
Ukrainian Premier League players
Ukrainian First League players
Association football midfielders